Charles Brown (19 December 1887 – 2 April 1966) was a New Zealand rugby union player. A halfback, Brown represented  at a provincial level, and was a member of the New Zealand national side, the All Blacks, in 1913 and 1920. He played nine matches for the All Blacks including two internationals.

During World War I, Brown served with the Field Engineers as part of the New Zealand Expeditionary Force. He played for the New Zealand Division team that won the Somme Cup in 1917 and, after the end of the war, for the New Zealand services team that toured Britain and South Africa.

Brown went on to coach at club level at Taranaki, and served as a Taranaki selector in 1925 and from 1932 to 1946, a North Island selector between 1947 and 1948, and also as a national selector. He was also a member of the management committee of the Taranaki Rugby Union from 1940 to 1950.

Brown died at New Plymouth on 2 April 1966, and was buried at Awanui Cemetery.

References

1887 births
1966 deaths
Rugby union players from New Plymouth
New Zealand rugby union players
New Zealand international rugby union players
Taranaki rugby union players
Rugby union scrum-halves
New Zealand military personnel of World War I
New Zealand rugby union coaches
New Zealand referees and umpires
Burials at Awanui Cemetery